McMurray or MacMurray is a surname. Notable people with the surname include:

Bill McMurray (b. 1943), Scottish footballer
Campbell McMurray (1893–?), Scottish professional footballer
Claudia A. McMurray, American Assistant Secretary of State
Fred MacMurray, American actor
Edward James McMurray, Canadian politician
Howard J. McMurray, American politician
Jack McMurray, Jr., Australian rules football field umpire
Jack McMurray, Sr., Australian rules football field umpire
Jamie McMurray, NASCAR driver
John MacMurray, Canadian musician
John Macmurray, Scottish philosopher
Jon McMurray, Canadian freeskier
Margaret McMurray, Scottish Gaelic speaker
Sarah Ann McMurray (née Silcock, 1848-1943), New Zealand Craftswoman and woodcarver 
Sam McMurray, American actor
Thomas Porter McMurray, British surgeon
W. Grant McMurray, Canadian Latter Day Saint
Will McMurray (1882–1945), American baseball catcher 
William McMurray (ca. 1813–1868), New York politician
William McMurray, founder of Fort McMurray, Canada
William McMurray (priest), 19th century Canadian Anglican bishop